Josh Jarman is a 2004 Australian comedy film directed by Pip Mushin and starring Marcus Graham. Filming took place around Melbourne, Australia.

Plot
Josh Jarman is a playwright who can't find anyone to produce his dramatic play. The only producer to show some interest would like to turn it into a musical.
This leaves Josh with a dilemma, does he sell out for fame and fortune or does he insist on his artistic integrity, but if he does that he will remain a struggling playwright?

Box office

Josh Jarman grossed $11,800 at the box office in Australia.

See also
Cinema of Australia

References

External links 
 

2004 films
2004 comedy films
Australian comedy films
2000s English-language films
2000s Australian films